is a hockey video game published by Konami for PlayStation and Game Boy Color in 2000. A Nintendo 64 version had been planned (and was even reviewed by Game Informer while in development), but was later cancelled. NHL Blades of Steel 2000 is the third and last game in the Blades of Steel series following Blades of Steel for the NES and NHL Blades of Steel '99 for the Nintendo 64.

Reception

The Game Boy Color version received average reviews, while the PlayStation version received unfavorable reviews, according to the review aggregation website GameRankings. Game Informer gave the latter console version a mixed review while it was still in development. In Japan, Famitsu gave it a score of 27 out of 40.

Notes

References

External links
 

2000 video games
Cancelled Nintendo 64 games
Game Boy Color games
Hockey video games
Konami games
PlayStation (console) games
Video games developed in the United Kingdom
Video games developed in Japan